Christ enthroned with the Virgin and St John (Italian: Cristo in trono tra la Vergine e san Giovanni) is a mosaic (385x223 cm) in the apse of Pisa Cathedral. It is famous for the depiction of John the Evangelist, the last work by the Italian medieval artist Cimabue. It is also the only work of his, which is dated and has historical documentation attributing it to Cimabue.

Cimabue took over the work on the mosaic after Francesco da Pisa, who completed the figure of Christ. Cimabue worked on the mosaic for 94 days until 19 February 1302 and was specifically stated to have finished the figure of St. John by that date. The whole mosaic, including the figure of Virgin, was only completed by the third artist, Vincino da Pistoia in 1321, almost 20 years after Cimabue's death.

The attribution to Cimabue is possible due to documented weekly payments of 10 soldi to the artist.
The work eventually went through four renovations and survived the fire of 1595.

References 

 

Italian mosaic
Italian art works
Pisa
Paintings depicting John the Apostle
Paintings depicting Jesus
Paintings of the Virgin Mary
Paintings by Cimabue